El Sobrante (Spanish for "the leftovers", "surplus", or "remaining land") is a census-designated place in Riverside County, California. The 2010 United States census reported El Sobrante's population was 12,723.

History
The area was originally named El Sobrante de San Jacinto, with Maria del Rosario Estudilllo de Aguirre receiving  a 5 league land grant in 1846. Her husband, José Antonio Aguirre, patented the grant in 1867.

Geography
According to the United States Census Bureau, the CDP covers an area of 7.2 square miles (18.7 km), all of it land.

Demographics
At the 2010 census El Sobrante had a population of 12,723. The racial makeup of El Sobrante was 7,435 (58.4%) White, 1,010 (7.9%) African American, 73 (0.6%) Native American, 2,240 (17.6%) Asian, 36 (0.3%) Pacific Islander, 1,312 (10.3%) from other races, and 617 (4.8%) from two or more races. Hispanic or Latino of any race were 3,626 persons (28.5%).

The census reported that 12,700 people (99.8% of the population) lived in households, 23 (0.2%) lived in non-institutionalized group quarters, and no one was institutionalized.

There were 3,679 households, 1,865 (50.7%) had children under the age of 18 living in them, 2,788 (75.8%) were opposite-sex married couples living together, 293 (8.0%) had a female householder with no husband present, 159 (4.3%) had a male householder with no wife present.  There were 117 (3.2%) unmarried opposite-sex partnerships, and 30 (0.8%) same-sex married couples or partnerships. 308 households (8.4%) were one person and 75 (2.0%) had someone living alone who was 65 or older. The average household size was 3.45.  There were 3,240 families (88.1% of households); the average family size was 3.65.

The age distribution was 3,667 people (28.8%) under the age of 18, 1,073 people (8.4%) aged 18 to 24, 3,579 people (28.1%) aged 25 to 44, 3,569 people (28.1%) aged 45 to 64, and 835 people (6.6%) who were 65 or older.  The median age was 35.8 years. For every 100 females, there were 96.4 males.  For every 100 females age 18 and over, there were 94.5 males.

There were 3,827 housing units at an average density of 530.7 per square mile, of the occupied units 3,365 (91.5%) were owner-occupied and 314 (8.5%) were rented. The homeowner vacancy rate was 1.7%; the rental vacancy rate was 3.7%.  11,498 people (90.4% of the population) lived in owner-occupied housing units and 1,202 people (9.4%) lived in rental housing units.

References

Census-designated places in Riverside County, California
Census-designated places in California